Lost Weekend is an EP by The Clientele. The EP was first issued in 2002 on Acuarela Records.

Track listing
 "North School Drive" - 2:24
 "Boring Postcard" - 1:09
 "Emptily Through Holloway" - 5:57
 "Kelvin Parade" - 4:07
 "Last Orders" - 6:35

2002 EPs
The Clientele albums